Microdes typhopa is a moth in the family Geometridae. It is found in Australia (including South Australia, the type location).

References

Moths described in 1897
Eupitheciini